The Margarita skink  (Copeoglossum margaritae) is a species of skink found on Margarita Island in Venezuela.

References

Copeoglossum
Reptiles described in 2012
Reptiles of Venezuela
Endemic fauna of Venezuela
Taxa named by Stephen Blair Hedges
Taxa named by Caitlin E. Conn
Lizards of the Caribbean